Son of the Dragon or variation may refer to:

 Son of the Dragon (audio drama) 2007 audio play featuring the Fifth Doctor
 Son of the Dragon (film) 2008 Hallmark Movie channel telefilm based on "The Thief of Bagdad"
 The Dragon's Son (2004 novel) by Margaret Weis, part of the Dragonvarld trilogy
 The Sons of the Dragon (2017 novella) George R.R. Martin story set in A Song of Ice and Fire (Game of Thrones)

See also
 Nine sons of the dragon, some dragon sons of the Dragon King in Chinese mythology
 Descendants of the Dragon 
 Dragon Sun (2001 novel) a story set in the world of Sid Meier's Alpha Centauri
 Sundragon (Pamela Douglas) a Marvel Comics superhero from the Marvel Universe
 Dracula (disambiguation), "Dracula" means 'son of the dragon' in Wallachian Romanian